Congregation Shaar Hashomayim is an Ashkenazi  synagogue in Westmount, Quebec. Incorporated in 1846, it is the oldest traditional Ashkenazi synagogue in Canada and the largest traditional synagogue in Canada.

History
thumb|right|Former building of Shaar Hashomayim on McGill College Avenue
Congregation Shaar Hashomayim was founded by a group of English, German and Polish Jews, who had previously attended the Spanish and Portuguese Synagogue. The Congregation originally rented space on Saint James Street (now rue Saint-Jacques). The first synagogue was built on Saint Constant Street (now rue de Bullion) in the Mile End in 1859. A new synagogue was built on McGill College Avenue between 1885 and 1886 at a cost of $40,000.

In 1920, the Congregation purchased land on Kensington Avenue in Westmount. The cornerstone was laid by president Lyon Cohen in 1921, and the synagogue was dedicated on September 17, 1922. Herman Abramowitz served as rabbi from 1902 to 1947, and Wilfred Shuchat as rabbi from 1948 to 1993.

In 2013, Shaar Hashomayim became one of the first Orthodox synagogues in North America to hire a Maharat.

Traditions
Shaar Hashomayim is one of the few remaining synagogues in the world to maintain, on a weekly basis, the traditions of the Choral Synagogues of Europe. The early by-laws of the synagogue in fact prescribed that the prayers be read according to the practices and traditions of the Great Synagogue of London; the Congregation established an all-male choir in 1887. A hazzan, accompanied by an all-male choir, lead services every Shabbat and on Jewish holidays.

The members of the clergy of Congregation Shaar Hashomayim are robed for every Shabbat, Festival and High Holy Day service, with the Cantor and Ritual Director wearing traditional cantorial hats. Clergy and officers wear morning suits, with the President, parnass and other congregational officers seated on the bimah wearing top hats. On Festivals, tailcoats replace the morning coats. Male congregants typically wear business attire and women are required to cover their shoulders.

Choir
Shaar Hashomayim's choir performed on Leonard Cohen's Grammy and Juno Award-winning album You Want It Darker. Together with Cantor Gideon Zelermyer, the Choir provided the backing vocals for "You Want It Darker" as well as "It Seemed the Better Way". They performed the album's title track and Cohen's "Tower of Song" at the 2017 Tower of Song: A Memorial Tribute to Leonard Cohen concert, in collaboration with Willie Nelson, Céline Dion, Peter Gabriel, and Chris Martin. The Choir also appeared on Cohen's posthumous album Thanks for the Dance, performing backing vocals for "Puppets".

Notable members

 Charles Bronfman, businessman
 Joe Cohen, trial lawyer and member of Quebec's Legislative Assembly
 Leonard Cohen, singer-songwriter
 Lyon Cohen, businessman
 Sheila Finestone, Member of Parliament and Senator
 Maxwell M. Kalman, architect
 Victoria Kaspi, astrophysicist
 Leo Kolber, Senator
 Marvin Kwitko, ophthalmologist
 Sam Steinberg, businessman

References

Ashkenazi Jewish culture in Quebec
Ashkenazi synagogues
Buildings and structures in Westmount, Quebec
English-Canadian culture
English-Jewish diaspora
German-Canadian culture in Quebec
German-Jewish diaspora
Moorish Revival synagogues
Orthodox synagogues in Canada
Polish-Canadian culture
Polish-Jewish culture in Canada
Synagogues completed in 1922
Synagogues in Montreal
Unaffiliated synagogues
20th-century religious buildings and structures in Canada